Harald Seeger (1 April 1922 – 18 May 2015) was an East German footballer and manager.

References

1922 births
2015 deaths
Association football outside forwards
East German footballers
East German football managers
East Germany national football team managers
1. FC Union Berlin managers